This article lists events from the year 2017 in Uganda.

Incumbents
 President: Yoweri Museveni
 Vice President: Edward Ssekandi
 Prime Minister: Ruhakana Rugunda

Events
21-31 May – The 2017 ICC World Cricket League Division Three occurs in Uganda

Deaths
4 February – Margaret Mungherera, psychiatrist and medical administrator (b. 1957).

References

Links

 
2010s in Uganda
Years of the 21st century in Uganda
Uganda
Uganda